Amtala  is a census town in South 24 Parganas district in the Indian state of West Bengal.

Other places with the same name are:
Amtala (Kamrup), a village in Kamrup district of Assam
Amtala, Murshidabad, a town in Murshidabad district of West Bengal